Fatal familial insomnia (FFI) is an extremely rare genetic (and even more rarely, sporadic) disorder that results in trouble sleeping as its hallmark symptom. The problems with sleeping typically start out gradually and worsen over time. Eventually, the patient will succumb to total insomnia (agrypnia excitata), most often leading to other symptoms such as speech problems, coordination problems, and dementia. It results in death within a few months to a few years and has no known cure.

Signs and symptoms
The disease has four stages:

 Characterized by worsening insomnia, resulting in panic attacks, paranoia, and phobias. This stage lasts for about four months.
 Hallucinations and panic attacks become noticeable, continuing for about five months.
 Complete inability to sleep is followed by rapid loss of weight. This lasts for about three months.
 Dementia, during which the person becomes unresponsive or mute over the course of six months, is the final stage of the disease, after which death follows.
Clinically, FFI manifests with a disordered sleep-wake cycle, dysautonomia, motor disturbances, and neuropsychiatric disorders.

Other symptoms include profuse sweating, miosis (pinpoint pupils), sudden entrance into menopause or  impotence, neck stiffness, and elevation of blood pressure and heart rate. The sporadic form of the disease often presents with double vision. Constipation is common as well. As the disease progresses, the person becomes stuck in a state of pre-sleep limbo, or hypnagogia, which is the state just before sleep in healthy individuals. During these stages, people commonly and repeatedly move their limbs as if dreaming.

The age of onset is variable, ranging from 13 to 60 years, with an average of 50. The disease can be detected prior to onset by genetic testing. Death usually occurs between 6–36 months from onset. The presentation of the disease varies considerably from person to person, even among people within the same family; in the sporadic form, for example, sleep problems are not commonly reported and early symptoms are ataxia, cognitive impairment, and double vision.

Cause

Fatal familial insomnia is a rare hereditary prion disease that is associated with the D178N-129M PRNP gene that is caused by a mutation. The gene PRNP that provides instructions for making the prion protein PrPC is located on the short (p) arm of chromosome 20 at position p13. Both people with FFI and those with familial Creutzfeldt–Jakob disease (fCJD) carry a mutation at codon 178 of the prion protein gene. FFI is also invariably linked to the presence of the methionine codon at position 129 of the mutant allele, whereas fCJD is linked to the presence of the valine codon at that position. The disease occurs when there is a change of amino acid at position 178 when an asparagine (N) is found instead of the normal aspartic acid (D). This has to be accompanied with a methionine at position 129.

FFI is an autosomal dominant disease that harbors a missense GAC to AAC mutation at codon 178 of the PRNP prion protein gene located on chromosome 20, along with the presence of the methionine polymorphism at position 129 of the mutant allele. Pathologically, FFI is characterized by predominant thalamic degeneration especially in the medio-dorsal and anterio-ventral nuclei. Phenotypic variability is a perplexing feature of FFI.

Pathophysiology
Given its striking clinical and neuropathologic similarities with fatal familial insomnia (FFI), a genetic prion disease linked to a point mutation at codon 178 (D178N) in the PRNP coupled with methionine at codon 129, the MM2T subtype is also known as sporadic FI (sFI). Transmission studies using susceptible transgenic mice have consistently demonstrated that the same prion strain is associated with both sFI and FFI. In contrast to what has been the rule for the most common neurodegenerative disorders, sFI is rarer than its genetic counterpart. Whereas the recognized patients with FFI are numerous and belong to >50 families worldwide, only about 30 cases of CJD MM2T and a few cases with mixed MM2T and MM2C features (MM2T+C) have been recorded to date.

In itself, the presence of prions causes reduced glucose to use by the thalamus and a mild hypo-metabolism of the cingulate cortex. The extent of this symptom varies between two variations of the disease, these being those presenting methionine homozygotes at codon 129 and methionine/valine heterozygotes being the most severe in the latter one. Given the relationship between the involvement of the thalamus in regulating sleep and alertness, a causal relationship can be drawn, and is often mentioned as the cause.

Diagnosis
Diagnosis is suspected based on symptoms and can be supported by a sleep study, a PET scan, and genetic testing if the patient's family has a history of the disease. Similar to other prion diseases, the diagnosis can only be confirmed by a brain autopsy at post-mortem.

Differential diagnosis
Other diseases involving the mammalian prion protein are known. Some are transmissible (TSEs, including FFI) such as kuru, bovine spongiform encephalopathy (BSE, also known as "mad cow disease") in cattle, and chronic wasting disease in American deer and American elk in some areas of the United States and Canada, as well as Creutzfeldt–Jakob disease (CJD). Until recently, prion diseases were only thought to be transmissible by direct contact with infected tissue, such as from eating infected tissue, transfusion, or transplantation; research suggests that prions can be transmitted by aerosols, but that the general public is not at risk of airborne infection.

Treatments
Treatment involves palliative care. There is conflicting evidence over the use of sleeping pills, including barbiturates, as a treatment for the disease. Symptoms of fatal familial insomnia may be treated with medications. Clonazepam may be prescribed to treat muscle spasms, and eszopiclone or zolpidem may be prescribed to help treat insomnia. However, these drugs do not work in the long term.

Prognosis
Like all prion diseases, the disease is invariably fatal. Life expectancy ranges from seven months to six years, with an average of 18 months.

Epidemiology & History

Fatal insomnia was first described by Lugaresi et al., in 1986.

In 1998, 40 families were known to carry the gene for FFI globally: eight German, five Italian, four American, two French, two Australian, two British, one Japanese, and one Austrian. In the Basque Country, Spain, 16 family cases of the 178N mutation were seen between 1993 and 2005 related to two families with a common ancestor in the 18th century. In 2011, another family was added to the list when researchers found the first man in the Netherlands with FFI. While he had lived in the Netherlands for 19 years, he was of Egyptian descent. Other prion diseases are similar to FFI and could be related, but are missing the D178N gene mutation.

, 37 cases of sporadic fatal insomnia have been diagnosed. Unlike in FFI, those with sFI do not have the D178N mutation in the PRNP-prion gene; they all have a different mutation in the same gene causing methionine homozygosity at codon 129.
Nonetheless, the methionine presence in lieu of the valine (Val129) is what causes the sporadic form of disease. The targeting of this mutation is another strategy that has been suggested as possible for treatment, or hopefully as cure for the disease.

Silvano, 1983, Bologna, Italy
In late 1983, Italian neurologist/sleep expert Dr. Ignazio Roiter received a patient at the University of Bologna hospital's sleep institute. The man, known only as Silvano, decided in a rare moment of consciousness to be recorded for future studies and to donate his brain for research in hopes of finding a cure for future victims.

Unnamed American patient, 2001
In a 2006 published article, Schenkein and Montagna wrote of a 52-year-old American man who was able to exceed the average survival time by nearly one year with various strategies that included vitamin therapy and meditation, different stimulants and hypnotics, and even complete sensory deprivation in an attempt to induce sleep at night and increase alertness during the day. He managed to write a book and drive hundreds of miles in this time, but nonetheless, over the course of his trials, the man succumbed to the classic four-stage progression of the illness.

Egyptian man, 2011, Netherlands

In 2011, the first reported case in the Netherlands was of a 57-year-old man of Egyptian descent. The man came in with symptoms of double vision and progressive memory loss, and his family also noted he had recently become disoriented, paranoid, and confused. While he tended to fall asleep during random daily activities, he experienced vivid dreams and random muscular jerks during normal slow-wave sleep. After four months of these symptoms, he began to have convulsions in his hands, trunk, and lower limbs while awake. The person died at age 58, seven months after the onset of symptoms. An autopsy revealed mild atrophy of the frontal cortex and moderate atrophy of the thalamus. The latter is one of the most common signs of FFI.

Research

In 2009, a mouse model was made for FFI. These mice expressed a humanized version of the PrP protein that also contains the D178N FFI mutation. These mice appear to have progressively fewer and shorter periods of uninterrupted sleep, damage in the thalamus, and early deaths, similar to humans with FFI.

The Prion Alliance was established by husband and wife duo Eric Minikel and Sonia Vallabh after Vallabh's mother was diagnosed with the fatal disease. They conduct research at the Broad Institute to develop therapeutics for human prion diseases. Other research interests involve identifying biomarkers to track the progression of prion disease in living people.

References

External links 

 

Neurodegenerative disorders
Transmissible spongiform encephalopathies
Unsolved problems in neuroscience
Sleep disorders
Rare diseases
Sleeplessness and sleep deprivation